Gravi de pugna is a forged letter written in the name of Augustine of Hippo which asserts that the morally superior side is always superior in battle and therefore that wars are proven to be just wars by their military success. The letter was widely accepted as authentic, and reassured soldiers that God was on their side.

Ideology 

Gravi de pugna is best known for its simple assertion that God will assure that the morally superior side will win military battles, and conversely, that victory itself validates that the use of force was appropriate. Udo Heyn claims this was a Germanic notion, and Phillip Wynn reports that it had long been believed in pagan antiquity by the time of this letter. This understanding was, in fact, utterly rejected by Augustine. Kelly DeVries regards the theology of Gravi de pugna as shallow and considers it to raise problems of theodicy and legitimacy as soon as the first Christian army loses.

Gravi also urges prayer for victory before battle, which was also rejected by Augustine, who found such prayers inappropriate.

History 
Gravi de pugna was written in the fifth century.
The letter was widely accepted as authentic from its introduction through the medieval era, and was the most frequently cited text in this period on holy war.
Gravi imbued the Crusaders with confidence that God was on their side, squelching all moral concerns and leading to behavior that did not comply with then-accepted rules of war.

The work lost influence with the renaissance of the 12th century, which developed more sophisticated jurisprudence and moral reasoning, At the same time, Augustine's own opinions on just wars, which had been largely unknown, were studied by the decretists and through them, Aquinas as well. The authenticity of Gravi de Pugna was not conclusively rejected until Erasmus.
Although it is regarded by contemporary scholars as "obviously un-Augustinian",
it is now widely recognized that Gravi de pugna has inaccurately influenced scholars of Augustine's views on war even up through modern times.

Published editions

See also 
 Holmgang
 Gott mit uns
 Trial by combat

Notes

Citations

References

Further reading 

 
 
 , also published in 
 
 

5th-century Christian texts
Augustine of Hippo
Catholic social teaching
Christian literature
Christianity and violence
Late Latin literature
Latin pseudepigrapha
Law of war
Legal doctrines and principles
Religious texts
Quotations from religion
Quotations from military
Ancient Roman philosophical literature